Bistrica is a settlement in the Municipality of Kozje in eastern Slovenia. It lies in the Sava Hills northwest of Kozje. The area is part of the historical Styria region. The municipality is now included in the Savinja Statistical Region.

The local church, built in the hamlet of Pokorna Vas in the settlement, is dedicated to Saint Andrew and belongs to the Parish of Zagorje. It dates to the first half of the 16th century.

References

External links
Bistrica on Geopedia

Populated places in the Municipality of Kozje